The Art of McCartney is a tribute album to English musician Paul McCartney, released on November 18, 2014. The 42-song set covers McCartney's solo work, and his work with the Beatles and Wings, and features a wide range of artists such as Barry Gibb, Brian Wilson, the Cure, B.B. King, Bob Dylan, Willie Nelson, Alice Cooper, Smokey Robinson, and Kiss. According to producer Ralph Sall, the project took 11 years to complete.

Background
Sall originally came up with the project in 2003 when he worked with McCartney on reviving the song "A Love for You" from McCartney's sessions for the 1971 album, Ram, for the In-Laws soundtrack. Sall got the approval from McCartney to begin work on the project and began recording songs with McCartney's backing band which includes guitarists Rusty Anderson and Brian Ray, keyboardist Paul "Wix" Wickens and drummer Abe Laboriel Jr. It was then that Sall started to seek out other artists to cover McCartney's work; the Beach Boys' founding member Brian Wilson was the first to come on board, with his cover of McCartney's "Wanderlust".

Release
The Cure featuring James McCartney, Paul's son, performing their cover of "Hello, Goodbye", was released on 9 September 2014 through Rolling Stone.

The album is available in a variety of formats, ranging from 34-track CD, vinyl and digital releases to a 42-track deluxe set with hardbound books, a DVD documentary about the making of the album, and more. A thousand-copy limited edition deluxe box set was also released and includes signed artwork by Beatles associate Alan Aldridge, a USB drive designed to look like McCartney's signature Hofner bass, the DVD documentary, an audio documentary, an illustrated guide to the release, art cards, CDs, vinyl and a certificate of authenticity.

Track listing

References 

2014 albums
The Beatles tribute albums
Paul McCartney